The Kandu or Kanu are a Hindu Bania caste in India.

The community was traditionally engaged in the sale of "foodstuffs and sundry eats". In 2001, they were granted the status of Other Backwards Class in the state of Uttar Pradesh under India's system of positive discrimination.

References

Social groups of Uttar Pradesh